Mayan Numerals is a Unicode block containing characters for the historical Mayan numeral system.

Block

History
The following Unicode-related documents record the purpose and process of defining specific characters in the Mayan Numerals block:

References 

Unicode blocks
Maya script